But or Bout is a gender-neutral Slavic surname that may refer to:
Serhiy But (born 1969), Ukrainian Olympic freestyle skier
Veniamin But (born 1961), Russian rower
Viktor Bout (born 1967), Russian arms dealer
Vladimir But (born 1977), Russian football midfielder

See also
Butt (surname)
Buts, surname

Russian-language surnames